Oak Hill Historic District may refer to:
(sorted by state, then city/town)

 Oak Hill Historic District (Oak Hill, Alabama), listed on the National Register of Historic Places (NRHP) in Wilcox County, Alabama
 Oak Hill Historic District (Fort Dodge, Iowa), listed on the NRHP in Webster County, Iowa
 Oak Hill Historic District (Hagerstown, Maryland), listed on the NRHP in Washington County, Maryland
 Oak Hill Historic District (Oak Hill, New York), listed on the NRHP in Greene County, New York
 Oak Hill Historic District (St. Louis, Missouri), listed on the NRHP in St. Louis County, Missouri
 Oak Hill Park Historic District, Olean, NY, listed on the NRHP in Cattaraugus County, New York

See also
Oak Hill (disambiguation)
Oak Hill Cemetery (disambiguation)